Haselden is a surname. Notable people with the surname include:

William Haselden (1872–1953), English cartoonist and caricaturist
John Haselden (1943–2020), British footballer and manager
Ron Haselden (born 1944), British artist
Frederick Haselden (1849–1934), New Zealand politician